The 1989–90 Sussex County Football League season was the 65th in the history of Sussex County Football League a football competition in England.

Division One

Division One featured 16 clubs which competed in the division last season, along with two new clubs, promoted from Division Two:
Ringmer
Seaford Town

Also, Haywards Heath changed name to Haywards Heath Town.

League table

Division Two

Division Two featured eleven clubs which competed in the division last season, along with five new clubs.
Clubs relegated from Division One:
Oakwood
Portfield
Clubs promoted from Division Three:
Franklands Village
Saltdean United
Stamco

League table

Division Three

Division Three featured ten clubs which competed in the division last season, along with four new clubs:
Buxted
East Grinstead, relegated from Division Two
Town Mead
Withdean

Also, Falcons changed name to Rottingdean.

League table

References

1989-90
1989–90 in English football leagues